Anlaby with Anlaby Common is a civil parish in the East Riding of Yorkshire, England. The parish includes the village suburb of Anlaby and the part of the area known as Anlaby Common.

Geography

It consists of the village of Anlaby, and hamlet of Anlaby Common, and the remaining part of the land area known as Anlaby Common, as of 2006 to the south of Anlaby village, primarily enclosed agricultural land. The parish borders Willerby and Kirk Ella to the north, Swanland to the west, Hessle to the south, and the unparished area of Hull to the east.

The land to the south of Anlaby within the parish includes the former house of Tranby Croft (as of 2014 Hull Collegiate School), and Sidney Smith School.

According to the 2011 UK census, Anlaby with Anlaby Common parish had a population of 9,794, a reduction from the 2001 UK census figure of 9,883.

It does not include the Hull suburb of Anlaby Park which is inside Hull's city limits.

References

Sources

External links

Civil parishes in the East Riding of Yorkshire